Howard Stark is a fictional character appearing in American comic books published by Marvel Comics. The character is usually depicted as a background character in stories featuring Iron Man and stories featuring Captain America. He is the founder of Stark Industries. Throughout the character's publication history, he has been featured in several incarnations of comic book series.

Howard Stark has also appeared in several animated television series and films. Actors John Slattery and Dominic Cooper have portrayed the character throughout the Marvel Cinematic Universe (MCU) franchise.

Publication history
Howard Stark was created by Archie Goodwin and designed by artist Don Heck. He made his first appearance in Iron Man #28 (August 1, 1970). He was loosely based on Howard Hughes, a film producer and aviator.

Described as a sarcastic scientist and ruthless businessman, Howard worked alongside his father on various projects, and later founded Stark Industries. He was an inventive mechanical engineering prodigy, constantly creating new technology and looking for ways to improve such technology. He designed and built weaponry and devices that have revolutionized the industrial world, such as various technologies used by S.H.I.E.L.D. and its allies. Howard later married to Maria Stark, and they had their child, Tony Stark. Howard's relationship with Tony was a difficult one. Howard's major weakness was his severe case of alcoholism, a problem Tony himself would inherit. In the comics, Howard and his wife died in a car crash, as the result of faulty brakes arranged by either business competitors Republic Oil & Gas or by V-Battalion. Howard's death inspired his son to take both business and engineering seriously as Iron Man.

Fictional character biography

Original depiction

Being the son of Howard Stark Sr., he was born in Richford, New York. An avid and brilliant inventor from a young age, Howard was a brilliant scientist throughout his life, becoming a power systems engineer. Stark and his father worked on various projects with his skills in engineering, and later founded Stark Industries. Throughout his young adulthood, Stark worked on various government projects dating back to the World War I and World War II era, like the Captain America project with John Crowe Ransom which came to completion thanks to Steve Rogers, the Manhattan Project, and the Arsenal robots hidden in a subbasement in his mansion. During the 1950s, Stark was an agent of the secret science organization known as The Shield (S.H.I.E.L.D), partnered with Nathaniel Richards.

Howard Stark married Maria Collins Carbonell and together they had a son, and adopted Anthony "Tony" Stark. He constantly pushed Tony to be the best, telling his son that someone must have "iron in their backbone" to be successful. Behind his heroic facade, however, he was an alcoholic who had a strained relationship with his son. Stark was capable of devotion and respect towards machines, but he appeared to have little to no interest towards his son. Due to his power as a businessman, Stark was offered membership to the exclusive Hellfire Club, but Stark seemed uninterested in anything other than the lavish parties the club threw. It is believed Stark was also a member of the V-Battalion. He was targeted by the Red Skull (Johann Schmidt), and is rumored to have met Uatu the Watcher. Stark also prevented Obadiah Stane from taking control of Stark Industries at least once.

On the Ides of March (March 15), Howard and Maria were killed in a car accident. It has been hinted that the incident was not random and possibly arranged by the V-Battalion, but this has never been confirmed; earlier indications were that the accident was caused by Roxxon's predecessor Republic Oil as part of Simon Krieger's corporate sabotage. Tony ran his father's company, started a charity in his mother's name, and later went on to be Iron Man.

Iron Man was briefly trapped in Hell by Doctor Doom, and faced what appeared to be Howard as one of Mephisto's torments. The spirit wore a demonic version of Iron Man's armor and taunted Iron Man about emotional weaknesses. Iron Man rejected the spirit's reality when claiming that Iron Man had been a disappointment to his mother as well as his father. However, Iron Man knew that Maria's love was unconditional.

During the 2014 Original Sin storyline, a flashback revealed that Stark first met Nick Fury following the death of Woody McCord during the fight against the Tribellians. Stark decided to show Fury the work McCord had been doing as a defender of Earth, neutralizing any potential threat for the planet, and offered Woody's job. Fury accepted, and over the next years, would secretly fight different superhuman threats from aliens to Subterranean monsters and extra-dimensional beings.

Howard Stark Sr.
Howard Stark Sr. is an obscure character. He is the father of Howard Stark and the grandfather of Tony Stark. He is occasionally mentioned in passing across various other comics under Marvel.

Duplicate of Howard Stark
Iron Man confronted Arsenal and Motherboard on the eScape to which Arno Stark followed and discovered the digital engrams of Howard and Maria then salvaged these digital engrams when the eScape shut down.

Arno is acquainted with the digital engrams of Howard and Maria and was able to give them a holographic form. With Jocasta's help, Arno is able to use bio-restructuring pods to give digital bodies to the digital engrams.

During the Iron Man 2020 storyline, Arno has breakfast with the duplicates of Howard and Maria following a nightmare about the Extinction Entity. After knocking out Mark One, the artificial simulation of Iron Man is brought to Arno's living quarters and learns what to the duplicates of their parents. At Port Authority, Iron Man catches up to the duplicates of Howard and Maria who are instructed to not leave the safety of Bain Tower. Their condition gets worse because they left Bain Tower and that Arno had to use his own DNA to fill out the missing pieces behind them. They suddenly stop moving as Arno plans to fix them and Tony. Arno is at his work station, working on reviving his parents by recreating the Arsenal and Mistress bodies from the eScape. Arno heads to the Stark Space Station with Arsenal and Mistress who now possess the memories of Howard Stark and Maria. The two of them state to Arno that they are proud. When Tony Stark uses the Thirteenth Floor to reach the Stark Space Station and confront Arno, Arsenal and Motherboard fight his allies until the arrival of the Extinction Entity. As everyone engages the Extinction Entity, Tony, Arno, Rescue, Machine Man, Jocasta, Motherboard, and Arsenal push the Extinction Entity close to Earth's orbit as the Avengers, Force Works, and the A.I. Army attack it's tentacles. It then turns out that the Extinction Entity was just a simulation and was the result of the disease that Arno thought he cured himself of. He now states that the holographic armor made from the eScape is now part of Arno's life support as he allows Motherboard and Arsenal to download themselves to shape Arno's virtual world.

Other versions

House of M
In the alternate reality seen in the 2005 House of M storyline, Howard Stark was alive while Maria Stark's status is unknown. Howard turned over control of the company to Tony Stark when his son turned sixteen. Although officially listed as retired, he worked with Tony to build an armor capable of taking on the Sentinels and powerful mutants during the conflict.

Howard and Tony began to work on Sentinels with Forge and Henry McCoy after being awarded them an exclusive contract. They planned to incorporate a "Vision Project", although there were problems with the control scheme. The two also competed on the wildly popular 'Sapien Deathmatch' television show.

When Tony investigated a resistance group as Iron Man, Sentinels attacked. One, remotely controlled by Howard, scolded Tony for getting involved. Howard was secretly plotting against Magneto with Hank Pym.

"Genome bomb" locations were discovered by Tony as Iron Man and the House was notified. Howard had programmed the Visions and Sentinels to serve him. He said this had all been part of a plan to make the mutants respect Tony for saving them. Tony would then use that as a chance to directly strike against Magneto. Tony refused to go along. Magneto suddenly appeared and personally dealt with Howard, killing him.

Iron Inquisitor
As part of Mephisto's campaign against the Avengers with the aid of his multiversal counterparts, one of the many alternate reality allies he recruited is a version of Howard Stark from Earth-4111 who made a deal with Mephisto for eternal power and immortality. Howard became enthralled to the Council of Red, to the point where he killed his son as part of the terms of the deal, and became the Iron Inquisitor, working as Hell's prime weaponer. As the Iron Inquisitor, he enacts Mephisto's will across the multiverse as his special agent.

Far from Avengers Mountain, Multiversal Masters of Evil members Doom Supreme and Kid Thanos meet up with Iron Inquisitor and Mephisto in the form of a dog as he nears the corpse of Orb. At one point, Kid Thanos insults Iron Inquisitor by claiming that his armor resembled a crustacean's shell. As Doom Supreme and Kid Thanos enter a portal to meet with their teammates and get back to work, Mephisto and Iron Inquisitor talk about what to do with the Multiversal Masters of Evil as Mephisto's dog form eats at the fragments of Uatu's eye. Iron Inquisitor was with the Council of Red when Mephisto made them known to Nighthawk and the Avengers.

Following the death of King Killmonger, Iron Man is lured into a cave by Howard Stark out of his Iron Inquisitor armor who wants to parley with him. While he claimed that Mephisto wants him to kill Iron Man, Howard wants to put aside his differences with Iron Man and reshape the future. After Iron Man blasts him, Howard sets off an EMP trap that shocks Iron Man and destroys his armor. Then he proceeds to beat up Tony. After Iron Man regains control of his armor and destroys the Iron Inquistor armor, Tony breaks Howard's hands and leaves him behind to watch the world develop the right way. Howard dares Iron Man to come back and finish him off.

Marvel Noir
In the Marvel Noir miniseries Iron Man Noir, set in the 1930s, Howard Stark is believed to have been killed by Nazi agents. It is eventually revealed that he was subjected to chemical brainwashing by the Nazis and became that reality's version of Baron Zemo. Under this guise, he builds war machines for the Nazis based on original designs he shared with Tony at a very young age. He dies when Iron Man destroys Baron von Strucker's airship.

Ultimate Marvel

The Ultimate Marvel version of Howard Stark is shown dealing with his second wife Maria Cerrera suffering a genetic accident while the brilliant scientist was pregnant. After Maria died during childbirth, Howard uses a newly invented biological armor to save the life of their son Antonio "Tony" Stark. A few years later, his business rival Zebediah Stane kidnaps and tortures Tony to attempt to learn how to manufacture the bio-armor for his own personal gain. Not long afterwards, Howard arrives with a SWAT team and arrests Zebediah. After the incident, a transparent version of the armor is developed, and Tony begins attending a prep school. This leads to Tony developing a prototype power-armor and befriending fellow student James Rhodes. After finding out that bullies were ordered from an unknown individual to kill Tony, Howard decides to enroll his son Tony, Rhodes, and Nifara into the Baxter Building, where Obadiah Stane (Zebediah Stane's son) was also enrolled. Shortly after their arrival, Tony and Howard witness Obadiah murdering a pair of students and make it look like an accident. Howard sees Tony make his first Iron Man armor with the intent to punish Obadiah. Sometime later, Howard was arrested based on planted evidence (by Obadiah) for Zebediah's murder. While the elder Stark was wrongly imprisoned for Zebediah's murder, his teenage son is forced to run Stark Enterprises. When Obadiah drugs a prison guard with a "hypnotizing bio-drug", the guard tries to kill Howard but fails. Howard is shot in the process and ends up in ICU. While his son Tony is trying to fix all of his current problems, Howard recovered enough to go to prison, but the guards sent to escort him were not sent by the Police Department. Howard fights them off and escapes. Tony meets with him and thinks Loni (Howard's first wife and Obadiah's mother) is the mastermind behind the scenes trying to kill them all. Tony, Rhodes, Nifara, Howard, and Obadiah set off to Utah to find Loni. They arrive and their chopper explodes injuring Rhodes. Obadiah falls off a cliff, but Tony catches him as terrorists arrive on the scene. Tony flees, but follows them as they take Obadiah to Loni Stark and their hideout. Tony breaks into the compound and Loni floods it with poison gas trying to kill him, abandoning Obadiah. Tony saves Obadiah, but Howard and Nifara are taken captive by Loni. After Loni kills Nifara, she confesses to Howard that all she ever wanted was power, hence why she married Howard, divorced him, remarried with Zebediah, had Obadiah, and later had Zebediah killed. Tony shows up, and Loni shoots Howard in the chest, threatening to shoot him again if he doesn't take the suit off. Tony takes off his Iron Man armor, and Loni shoots him in the head, not knowing that his entire body is a brain and will heal itself. Tony fights Loni, beats her, and tends to his father. Obadiah, mad that his mom abandoned him for dead with the poison gas, enters the room and kills her. Tony, Obadiah and Howard are all picked up by the feds and go home. This version depicted in the Ultimate Iron Man series have been retconned as an in-universe fictional TV show about Iron Man's life.

The real history for the Ultimate version of Howard Stark is told in Ultimate Comics: Iron Man. In addition to being Gregory Stark's father, he is the founder of Stark Enterprises, but sought help from Chinese conglomerate Mandarin International. While his son Tony Stark is trying to start a company of his own along with girlfriend Josie Gardner, Howard continually tries to persuade Tony to take his place as the CEO which his son eventually does after Josie's death.

The Ultimate version of Howard Stark Sr., created by Warren Ellis and Steve Kurth, and first appeared in Ultimate Comics: Armor Wars #4 (April 2010), is an equivalent of Titanium Man which also resembles Iron Monger as well. Having faked his own death, he went to work for "Project Tomorrow" to create human/machine hybrids, such as himself and the Arsenal Units. Desiring an "upgrade" for himself, Howard hired Ghost and Justine Hammer to steal upgrades from Iron Man's lab. After Remnant 242's theft, Howard Sr. (confused about what the item can do) forces his subordinates to have answers, eventually coercing his grandson to unlock Remnant 242 but is surprised to instead discover a mechanism that could shut down and destroy machinery, which caused Howard Sr. to die instantly without his damaged machine body.

In other media

Television
 Howard Stark appeared in Iron Man, voiced by Neil Ross in "The Origin of Iron Man" and by Peter Renaday in "Not Far From The Tree". In the former episode, Howard died following a plane accident. In the latter episode, it is revealed that A.I.M. captured him for a telepathy experiment before creating a clone of him to assist in efforts to take over Stark Industries. While the plan is foiled, the clone escapes capture and vows to return.
 Howard Stark appears in Iron Man: Armored Adventures, voiced by Fred Henderson. This version was presumed dead following an airplane crash, but was secretly kidnapped by the Mandarin, who sought his help in finding the Makluan rings. Near the end of the series, Iron Man rescues Howard, who assists his son and his allies in thwarting a Makluan invasion.
 Howard Stark appears in the introduction sequence of Marvel Anime: Iron Man.
 Howard Stark appears in Avengers Assemble, voiced by Stephen Collins in the original airing of "Thanos Rising", Troy Baker in the released version of "Thanos Rising", and Charlie Schlatter in "New Year's Resolution". This version is the creator of Arsenal and a friend of Peggy Carter.

Film
 Early screenplay drafts written by Alfred Gough, Miles Millar, and David Hayter for New Line Cinema's Iron Man film pitted Iron Man against Howard as War Machine.
 Howard Stark appears in the 2007 animated direct-to-video film The Invincible Iron Man, voiced by John McCook. This version is still alive, serves as the head of Stark International, and has a strained relationship with Tony Stark over Maria Stark's passing until father and son eventually reconcile and agree to run the company equally.

Marvel Cinematic Universe

 Howard Stark appears in media set in the Marvel Cinematic Universe, primarily portrayed by John Slattery and Dominic Cooper. This version contributed to the Arc Reactor's creation and co-founded S.H.I.E.L.D. before he was killed by Hydra, with his death covered up as a car accident.
 Gerard Sanders portrays Howard in a brief memorial slideshow presentation in the beginning of the live-action film Iron Man (2008).
 Slattery first portrays Howard in the live-action film Iron Man 2 (2010), in which he uses a film reel to posthumously reconcile with his son Tony Stark and help perfect the Arc Reactor.
 Cooper first portrayed a younger iteration in the live-action film Captain America: The First Avenger (2011). Amidst World War II, Howard aids the Strategic Scientific Reserve's Super Soldier Project before aiding Steve Rogers in the fight against Hydra. Following Rogers's apparent death, Howard recovers the Tesseract.
 Cooper reprises his role in the live-action Marvel One-Shot film Agent Carter, in which he recruits Peggy Carter to help him form S.H.I.E.L.D. in 1946.
 Cooper reprises his role in the live-action TV series Agent Carter. In season one, Howard tasks Carter with stopping Leviathan after the terrorists framed him for selling his technology on the black market while he goes incognito and tasks his butler Edwin Jarvis with helping Carter and secretly reporting back to him. In season two, Howard helps Carter combat Whitney Frost after she acquires Zero Matter powers.
 Slattery reprised the role for a cameo in a flashback in the live-action film Ant-Man (2015), in which he is a superior of Hank Pym.
 Slattery again reprised the role in a flashback in the live-action film Captain America: Civil War (2016), in which his and Maria Stark's deaths are revealed to have been committed by Hydra's brainwashed enforcer, the Winter Soldier.
 Slattery portrays an alternate timeline version of Howard in the live-action film Avengers: Endgame, in which he encounters and converses with a time-traveling Tony, but never learns his true identity.
 Cooper voices an alternate timeline version of Howard in the Disney+ animated series What If...? episode "What If... Captain Carter Were the First Avenger?".

Video games
 Howard Stark, based on Dominic Cooper's portrayal, appears in Captain America: Super Soldier, voiced by Liam O'Brien.
 Howard Stark appears in Lego Marvel Super Heroes.

References

External links

Howard Stark (Marvel Database)

Characters created by Archie Goodwin (comics)
Characters created by Don Heck
Comics characters introduced in 1970
Fictional alcohol abusers
Fictional murdered people
Fictional aviators
Fictional businesspeople
Fictional engineers
Fictional inventors
Fictional spymasters
Iron Man characters
Marvel Comics scientists
Marvel Comics television characters
S.H.I.E.L.D. agents